East Angus may refer to:

East Angus (UK Parliament constituency)
East Angus, Quebec